Colony cheese is a type of cheese made in the highlands of the Brazilian state of Rio Grande do Sul and in Uruguay. It is one of the icons of southern Brazilian cuisine, also being produced in Santa Catarina, despite being originally from Uruguay.

Production 

This cheese is made by artisan production, usually in rural areas of the highlands, especially in regions settled by German and Italian immigrants who starting almost two hundred years ago brought with them their cheese-making traditions. It has low production cost, due to its simple manufacturing process, consisting mainly of milk, salt and milk enzymes. It typically goes through a maturation process that can take several months. The aging gives the cheese its most striking feature: a soft, slightly spicy inside, complex flavor and surrounded by a solid yellow crust. The older the cheese gets, bigger and harder its crust get, making the taste of this product more pungent and striking.

There can be a formation of small white mold in its external part, but that does not affect the quality of the product. This problem can be solved by storing it in environments of low relative humidity. Usually this cheese is consumed accompanied by red wines, or it can also be used for cooking, especially in pizzas, lasagnas and other pastas.

Features

Description: mildly spicy, lactic-tasting, close dough, pale yellow colour. Produced without the use of dyes or preservatives.
Consistency: hard or semi-hard outside. Soft, fairly creamy inside, showing good elasticity. Easily sliced and well melted when subjected to heat.

History

Juan Teófilo Karlen originally brought this cheese to the Swiss colony Nueva Helvecia, located Colonia Uruguay, therefore its name.

See also 
German-Brazilian
List of Brazilian dishes
Riograndenser Hunsrückisch
 List of cheeses

Sources
 https://www.wikidata.org/wiki/Q28777824

Brazilian cheeses
Cow's-milk cheeses